Fijiana Drua are a Fijian rugby union team based in Australia. Rugby Australia announced in February 2022 that they had joined the Super W competition.

History 
The Fijiana Drua is the first Fijian team to join the Super W competition with support from the Australian Government’s PacificAus Sports program. The Fiji Rugby Union announced that Rooster Chicken were the official sponsors of the Fijiana Drua for the current Super W season.

Fijiana Drua won all matches of the 2022 Super W and claimed the title in their historic first season. They defeated the NSW Waratahs 32–26 in the final. In November 2022, the Fijiana Drua confirmed their participation for the 2023 Super W season with two home and three away round-robin matches.

Current squad 
On 9 February, the squad for the 2022 Super W season was announced.

Season standings

Coaching staff and management 
Coaching Staff announced by Fiji Rugby Union:

 Head Coach: Senirusi Seruvakula
 Assistant Backs Coach: Michael Legge
 Assistant Forwards Coach: Inoke Male
 Trainers: Sanaila Vitau, Tavaita Rowati
 Physio: Ratu Isimeli Veigisigisi
 Analyst: Josua Vuto
 Team Manager: Talei Mow

See also

 Fijian Latui
 Fiji Warriors
 Fijian Drua

References 

Rugby clubs established in 2022
Fijian rugby union teams
Diaspora sports clubs in Australia
Super W
Fijian Drua
Women's rugby union teams